Parliamentary elections were held in Portugal on 8 July 1865.

Results

References

1865
Portugal
1865 in Portugal
July 1865 events